Haavara (Transfer) Ltd. was a company founded as a result of the Haavara Agreement made during the Nazi regime's control over Germany.  The company facilitated the emigration of approximately 50,000 Jews from Germany to Palestine.

See also
Haavara Agreement

References and notes

Jewish emigration from Nazi Germany